Henri Biancheri (30 July 1932 – 1 December 2019) was a French association football player and sports executive. He played midfielder for 14 seasons including seven at AS Monaco FC where he was a member of two Ligue 1 championship squads and twice a winner of the Coupe de France. He also earned two caps with the France national team in 1960.

After he retired as a player, he became a commercial director at Adidas from 1966 to 1986, and then technical director at Monaco until 2005. He left Monaco to work in recruiting for Olympique de Marseille.

Later in life, he became a naturalized citizen of Monaco and retired there after he left Marseille. He died on 1 December 2019 at the age of 87.

References

External links
 
 
 Profile at FFF 
 Profile at a.s.monaco.free.fr 

1932 births
2019 deaths
Footballers from Marseille
French footballers
French expatriate sportspeople in Monaco
Expatriate footballers in Monaco
France international footballers
Association football midfielders
FC Sochaux-Montbéliard players
Angers SCO players
AS Monaco FC players
Racing Club de France Football players
Ligue 1 players
Ligue 2 players